Neqab (also known as Naughab, Noqāb, Nowghāb, and Nowqāb) is a village in Rostaq Rural District, in the Central District of Khalilabad County, Razavi Khorasan Province, Iran. At the 2006 census, its population was 2,248, in 596 families.

References 

Populated places in Khalilabad County